The men's kumite +84 kg competition in karate at the 2017 World Games took place on 26 July 2017 at the GEM Sports Complex in Wrocław, Poland.

Results

Elimination round

Group A

Group B

Finals
{{#invoke:RoundN|N4
|widescore=yes|bold_winner=high|team-width=200
|RD1=Semifinals
|3rdplace=yes

||{{flagIOC2athlete|Hideyoshi Kagawa|JPN|2017 World Games}}|7||4
|||2|{{flagIOC2athlete|Sajjad Ganjzadeh|IRI|2017 World Games}}|3

||{{flagIOC2athlete|Hideyoshi Kagawa|JPN|2017 World Games}}|6||5

||

References

Karate at the 2017 World Games
2017 World Games